Actias sinensis, the Golden moon moth, is a moth of the Family Saturniidae. It is found in China, Taiwan, Vietnam, Myanmar, India and Thailand. The species was first described by Francis Walker in 1855.

Subspecies
Actias sinensis sinensis
Actias sinensis subaurea Kishida, 1993 (northern China)

Gallery

References

 , 2012: six new species of the genus Actias Leach, 1815 from South-East Asia. (Lepidoptera: Saturniidae). Entomo-Satsphingia 5 (3): 41-51.
 , 1993. Description of a New Subspecies of Actias heterogyna , 1914 from Taiwan (Lepidoptera, Saturniidae). Gekkan-Mushi (267): 18-20.

Sinensis
Moths described in 1847
Moths of Asia